José Quiñones may refer to:

 José Luis Quiñones (born 1974), Puerto Rican boxer
 José Severo Quiñones (1838–1909), Puerto Rico judge
 José Quiñones Gonzales (1914–1941), Peruvian military aviator